The World Series is the annual championship series of Major League Baseball (MLB) and concludes the MLB postseason. First played in 1903, the World Series championship is a best-of-seven playoff and is a contest between the champions of baseball's National League (NL) and American League (AL). Often referred to as the "Fall Classic", the modern World Series has been played every year since 1903 with two exceptions: in 1904, when the NL champion New York Giants declined to play the AL champion Boston Americans; and in 1994, when the series was canceled due to the players' strike.

The best-of-seven style has been the format of all World Series except in 1903, 1919, 1920, and 1921, when the winner was determined through a best-of-nine playoff. Although the large majority of contests have been played entirely during the month of October, a small number of Series have also had games played during September and November. The Series-winning team is awarded the Commissioner's Trophy. Players, coaches and others associated with the team are generally given World Series rings to commemorate their victory; however, they have received other items such as pocket watches and medallions in the past. The winning team is traditionally invited to the White House to meet the President of the United States.

A total of 118 World Series have been contested through 2022, with the AL champion winning 67 and the NL champion winning 51. The New York Yankees of the AL have played in 40 World Series, winning 27 – the most championship appearances and most victories by any team amongst the major North American professional sports leagues. The Dodgers of the NL have the most losses with 14, while the Yankees have the most losses among AL teams with 13.  The St. Louis Cardinals have won 11 championships, the most championships among NL clubs and second-most all-time behind the Yankees, and have made 19 total appearances, third-most among NL clubs. The Dodgers have represented the NL the most in the World Series with 21 appearances.

The Seattle Mariners are the only current MLB franchise that has never appeared in a World Series; the San Diego Padres, Colorado Rockies, Texas Rangers, Tampa Bay Rays, and Milwaukee Brewers have all played in the Series but have never won it. The Los Angeles Angels, Arizona Diamondbacks and Washington Nationals are the only teams who have won their only World Series appearance, and the Toronto Blue Jays and the Miami Marlins have won both of their World Series appearances. The Toronto Blue Jays are the only franchise from outside the United States to appear in and win a World Series, winning in 1992 and 1993. The Houston Astros are the only franchise to have represented both the NL (2005) and the AL (2017, 2019, 2021, 2022), winning the Series in 2017 and 2022.

The current (2022) World Series champions are the Houston Astros.

World Series results
Numbers in parentheses in the table are World Series appearances as of the date of that World Series, and are used as follows:
 Winning team and losing team columns indicate the number of times that team has appeared in a World Series as well as each respective team's World Series record to date.

Legend
  The 2020 World Series and all of its previous playoff games in the 2020 postseason were played at a neutral venue and with limited attendance due to the global COVID-19 pandemic.
  The 1907, 1912, and 1922 World Series each included one tied game.
  The 1903, 1919, 1920, and 1921 World Series were in a best-of-nine format (carried by the first team to win five games).
  Indicates a team that made the playoffs as a wild card team (rather than by winning a division).
  The Brewers were in the American League from 1969 to 1997, after which they moved to the National League.
  The Astros were in the National League from 1962 to 2012, after which they moved to the American League.

Source for this Table

World Series records by franchise

In the sortable table below, teams are ordered first by number of wins, then by number of appearances, and finally by year of first appearance. In the "Season(s)" column, bold years indicate winning appearances.

Frequent matchups
The following are the 20 matchups of teams that have occurred two or more times in the World Series. All teams that have participated in these were "Classic Eight" members of either the American or National League; no expansion team (created in 1961 or later) has faced the same opponent more than once in a World Series.

See also

 List of National League pennant winners
 List of American League pennant winners
 List of Major League Baseball franchise postseason streaks
 List of Major League Baseball franchise postseason droughts
 List of pre-World Series baseball champions

References

External links
 WorldSeries.com – official website
 List of World Series winning rosters

Champions
World Series